James Harvey Boyce Sr., known as Jimmy Boyce (October 6, 1922 – May 15, 1990) was Louisiana businessman and politician, who chaired the Louisiana Republican Party from 1972 to 1976.

Background
Born in Carrollton, Missouri, he graduated from Baton Rouge High School and attended Culver Military Academy in Culver, Indiana, and for a year, Louisiana State University.

Boyce served as a United States Navy pilot during World War II, and later worked for Caterpillar Company.

Boyce married Katherine Jane Thibaut, with whom he had three sons.

Boyce attended the 1964 Republican National Convention in San Francisco, he as an alternate delegate.

Boyce died in 1990, at the age of 67.

References

1922 births
1990 deaths
People from Carrollton, Missouri
Politicians from Baton Rouge, Louisiana
Louisiana Republicans
Louisiana State Republican chairmen
Businesspeople from Louisiana
Military personnel from Louisiana
Baton Rouge Magnet High School alumni
Culver Academies alumni
Louisiana State University alumni
United States Navy personnel of World War II
United States Navy officers
American Episcopalians
20th-century American businesspeople